Leticia Ramona Martínez Forcado (born 21 December 1988) is a Paraguayan handball player for San Lorenzo BM and the Paraguay national team.

She was selected to represent Paraguay at the 2017 World Women's Handball Championship.

References

1988 births
Living people
Paraguayan female handball players
20th-century Paraguayan women
21st-century Paraguayan women